Bao Nguyen may refer to:
 Bao Nguyen (filmmaker), American documentary director, cinematographer and producer
 Bao Nguyen (politician) (born 1980), American politician